
Year 155 BC was a year of the pre-Julian Roman calendar. At the time it was known as the Year of the Consulship of Corculum and Marcellus (or, less frequently, year 599 Ab urbe condita). The denomination 155 BC for this year has been used since the early medieval period, when the Anno Domini calendar era became the prevalent method in Europe for naming years.

Events 
 By place 

 Hispania 
 Under the command of Punicus and then Cesarus, the Lusitani, a Hispanic tribe, reach a point near modern day Gibraltar. Here they are defeated by the Roman praetor Lucius Mummius.

 Roman Republic 
 As part of the Roman efforts to fully conquer and occupy the whole of Illyria, a Roman army under consul Publius Cornelius Scipio Nasica Corculum attacks the Dalmatians for the first time and conquers the Dalmatian capital of Delminium. As a result, the Dalmatians are compelled to pay tribute to Rome, which puts an end to the first Dalmatian war. In recognition of his victory, Corculum is granted a triumph in Rome.

 Bactria 
 Menander I (known as Milinda in Sanskrit and Pali) begins his reign as king of the Indo-Greek Kingdom. His territories cover the eastern dominions of the divided Greek empire of Bactria (Panjshir and Kapisa) and extend to the modern Pakistani province of Punjab, most of the Indian states of Punjab and Himachal Pradesh and the Jammu region. His capital is considered to have been Sagala, a prosperous city in northern Punjab believed to be modern Sialkot.

Deaths 
 Empress Dowager Bo, imperial concubine of Emperor Gao of the Han dynasty

References